Stéphane Joseph Jean-Jacques Richer (born June 7, 1966) is a Canadian former professional ice hockey right winger.

Playing career
Richer was drafted 29th overall by the Montreal Canadiens in the 1984 NHL Entry Draft. He played in 1,054 career NHL games, scoring 421 goals and 398 assists for 819 points. Richer won the Calder Cup in 1985. He also won the Stanley Cup with the Montreal Canadiens in 1986 and with the New Jersey Devils in 1995.

After his Stanley Cup run in New Jersey, he found himself bouncing from team to team through trades including Pittsburgh, Tampa Bay, St. Louis, a second stint in Montreal, and even a trip back to the minors before ultimately retiring.

Richer is among the all-time leaders (tied in second with six other players) in playoff overtime goals, with four:
 April 8, 1989 – At 5:01 of overtime, the Canadiens defeat the Hartford Whalers in Game 3 of the Adams Division Semifinals
 April 19, 1991 – A mere 27 seconds into overtime, Richer ends Game 2 of the Adams Division Finals with a 4–3 win over the Boston Bruins.
 May 7, 1994 – At 14:19 of overtime, Game 4 ends of the Eastern Conference Semifinals ends with a 5–4 Devils victory over the Bruins.
 May 15, 1994 – Game 1 of the Eastern Conference Finals concludes with a 4–3 New Jersey win over the New York Rangers at 15:23 of the second overtime.

Richer scored 50 goals for the Montreal Canadiens in 1987–88 and 51 in 1989–90, becoming the only player to do so since Guy Lafleur's heyday. To this date, Richer is the last player to have scored 50 goals in one season for the Montreal Canadiens.

The ensuing year after winning the Cup, New Jersey missed the playoffs, and Richer was traded back to the Montreal Canadiens in 1996.

Richer confirmed during the 2001–02 season that he has been battling depression during the majority of his career.

Playing style
Richer was known to have one of the hardest shots in the NHL during his playing days, coupled with an extremely quick release. Unlike many other players, Richer only had to wind up his stick to about waist height to achieve full power on his shot. Recognition of his hard shot was noticed even more when Fleer trading cards included Richer in their "Slapshot Artists" limited set for the 1994–95 season. During the 1994 New Jersey Devils team-only skills competition prior to the All-Star Game, Richer recorded multiple slapshots that exceeded the 100 mph mark.

In a well documented legend, during one pre-game warm up session in New Jersey, Richer fired a slapshot at his own goalie, Martin Brodeur, which shattered the cup in Brodeur's jock strap, leaving him bruised and nauseated. Brodeur had to leave the ice and change equipment moments before the game started.

A fast skater with a big body (approx. 6'3", 225 lbs.), Richer used skill and his shot to beat opponents as opposed to a hard-hitting power forward style which was prototypical of an NHL player of his proportions.

Scouting reports frequently criticized Richer for not squeezing more production out of his talent, given his physical gifts (size, skill, skating ability). He was sometimes described as "coasting" during the regular season and playing hard only when the playoffs began, although his statistics do not support this perception (his career regular-season points per game of 0.78 is higher than his 0.73 average in the playoffs).

Retirement
In October 2009, Richer began competing as a pairs figure skater on the CBC Television reality show Battle of the Blades with Marie-France Dubreuil.

On February 8, 2011, Richer appeared along with Darryl Strawberry on a documentary by Michael Landsberg to talk about his past battle with depression.

Records and achievements
Youngest Montreal Canadiens player to score 50 goals in a season- 21 years old
Youngest Montreal Canadiens player to score 100 goals in his career- 22 years, 205 days
 One of only two Montreal Canadiens players to have two 50 goal seasons with the team (Guy Lafleur did it six times)
 2x Stanley Cup Champion (1986 and 1995)

Career statistics

Regular season and playoffs

International

See also
List of NHL players with 50-goal seasons
List of NHL players with 1,000 games played

References

External links

1966 births
Battle of the Blades participants
Canadian ice hockey left wingers
Chicoutimi Saguenéens (QMJHL) players
Detroit Vipers players
Granby Bisons players
Living people
Montreal Canadiens draft picks
Montreal Canadiens players
National Hockey League All-Stars
New Jersey Devils players
People from Outaouais
Pittsburgh Penguins players
St. Louis Blues players
Sherbrooke Canadiens players
Stanley Cup champions
Tampa Bay Lightning players